Rudolf Karl Fischer (13 July 1913, Leipzig – 29 July 2003) was a German pianist, pedagogue and rector at the Felix Mendelssohn College of Music and Theatre in Leipzig.

Biography
Fischer was rector of the Felix Mendelssohn College of Music and Theatre from 1948 to 1973. He initiated the International Johann Sebastian Bach Competition, Leipzig in 1964 and served as the president of the competition until 1973. Fischer was president of the "Association Européene de Conservatoires, Academies de Musique et Musik-Hochschulen" between 1968 and 1974.

As a performer he played with the Gewandhausorchester, Leipzig and the Staatskapelle Dresden and made several recordings. He was also a member of the Schumann-Gesellschaft, Zwickau and the Neue Bachgesellschaft, Leipzig.

1913 births
2003 deaths
Musicians from Leipzig
People from the Kingdom of Saxony
German classical pianists
Recipients of the Patriotic Order of Merit
20th-century German pianists
East German musicians